Aída del Carmen Jesús Consuelo García-Naranjo Morales (born 20 March 1951), also known by her nickname "Mocha", is a Peruvian educator, singer, and politician, the former Secretary General of the Socialist Party and spokesperson of Gana Perú, the alliance of former President Ollanta Humala.

She was the first Minister of Women and Social Development in the Humala government.

She served as the ambassador of Peru to Uruguay from January 2012 to June 2014. Since February 2012, she has also been the Peruvian representative to Mercosur and the Latin American Integration Association (ALADI).

Biography
Aída García Naranjo studied Education at the Pontifical Catholic University of Peru. She also has a master's degree in political Science and Government from the same university and two  – in "Migrations, Globalization, and International Relations" and "Economic, Social, and Cultural Rights" – from Cayetano Heredia University.

She was a councilor of the Municipality of Metropolitan Lima from 1990 to 1993. She was director of Mujeres Magazine from 1995 to 2011, and since 2011 she has been the Executive Director of the Center for Rights and Development (CEDAL).

She has been a member of the Consultative Council of the Peasant Confederation of Peru, advises the Secretariat of Women's Affairs, and also advised the National Women's Mining Center from 2002 to 2008.

She is a member of "Espacios Sin Fronteras" (UNASUR's migrations network) and Honorary Cultural Attaché of the Embassy of the Republic of Nicaragua in Peru. She was an officer of the General Peru-Canada Countervalue Fund.

She is the author of 14 books, many of them on feminism in Peru. Among her works are Nosotras las mujeres del Vaso de Leche, Construyendo la equidad: El futuro como tarea, Hombres y mujeres de igual a igual, Mujer Peruana Situación Nacional, La plataforma nacional de la Mujer Peruana, and Mujeres Notables 1900–2010.

Minister of Women
She became the head of the Ministry of Women and Social Development on 28 July 2011.

PRONAA scandal
On 20 September 2011, three children were poisoned and died after eating food from the National Food Assistance Program (PRONAA), a body under the Ministry of Women and Social Development. Hours later García Naranjo continued with activities to celebrate one of the institutions (for which she would later apologize). Afterward the parliamentarians of Force 2011 criticized the minister's inaction and asked for her interpellation, which was not supported by the other parliamentary groups. Days later six other children and a teacher were sickened by food from the same institution.

García Naranjo presented herself to the Congress of the Republic on 6 October, and on 13 October, the body rejected the motion of censure against her.

See also
 Humala administration

References

External links
 

1951 births
Ambassadors of Peru to Uruguay
Government ministers of Peru
Living people
Peruvian educators
20th-century Peruvian women singers
20th-century Peruvian singers
Peruvian feminists
Peruvian women activists
Pontifical Catholic University of Peru alumni
Singers from Lima
Socialist Party (Peru) politicians
Women government ministers of Peru
Women's ministers